Paul Bonnefond (born 13 September 1988) is a French rugby union player. His position is wing and he currently plays for Castres Olympique in the Top 14. He began his career with Castres before moving to US Oyonnax for a season. He returned to Castres Olympique in 2011.

Honours

Club 
 Castres
Top 14: 2012–13

References

1988 births
Living people
French rugby union players
Sportspeople from Tours, France
Castres Olympique players
Rugby union wings
US Montauban players
Oyonnax Rugby players
France international rugby sevens players
Rugby Club Vannes players
Lyon OU players